St George Christian School is a multi-campus independent non-denominational Christian co-educational primary and secondary day school, located in Hurstville and Sans Souci, both suburbs of southern Sydney, in the St George area of New South Wales, Australia.

Established in 1981, the school has a non-selective enrolment policy, and currently caters for approximately 800 students from Year K to Year 12. Students come to St George Christian School mainly from the southern Sydney region.

St George Christian School is a member of Christian Schools Australia.

Overview
St George Christian School was founded by five local Christian families in February 1981, with nine students from Kindergarten to Year 4. By 1984 the school was operating out of two campuses, and the first Year 12 class graduated in 1989. The first teacher was Hazel Burns. The school moved to double streaming in 1995 and triple streaming from Year 7 in 2003. The school implemented a Middle School in 2008 to cater for the specific needs of early adolescence. From 2009, there are four departments representing the particular educational needs of each stage of development.

 Infants School - Kindergarten - Year 2
 Junior School - Years 3 - 5
 Middle School - Years 6 - 8
 Senior School - Years 9 - 12

Principals
The following men have served as Principals of St George Christian School:

Campus
St George Christian School has two campuses: the main school at Hurstville (Junior, Middle and Senior Schools and the School Office), and the Infants at Sans Souci.

Curriculum
St George Christian School is a co-educational school with a traditional academic approach designed to prepare students for life beyond their studies. The school is registered and accredited with the New South Wales Board of Studies and therefore follows the mandated curriculum for all years.

Infants and Junior Schools
Kindergarten to Year 5 study the six Key Learning Areas: English, Mathematics, Science and Technology, Human Society and its Environment (HSIE), Creative Arts, Personal Development, Health and Physical Education (PDHPE). A distinct feature of Infants and Junior Schools is a dedicated sports teacher who coordinates all sport, PE and carnivals. Students are also involved in a systematic Bible program, along with daily devotions and many times of prayer and praise.

A Student Support Program is provided to assist students in particular areas of learning where assistance is given on either individual and/or small group basis.

A Student Enrichment Program is offered to students commencing in Year 1 to provide a variety of challenging learning opportunities to those students who require particular extension.

Middle school
Year 6 continue to study the six Key Learning Areas: English, Mathematics, Science and Technology, HSIE, Creative Arts, PDHPE. Beginning in Year 7, Science and Technology becomes two distinct subjects, Creative Arts also divides into Drama, Visual Arts and Music as their own subjects. Weekly sport afternoons are a component of the Middle School curriculum.

A Student Support Program is provided to assist students in particular areas of learning where assistance is given on either individual and/or small group basis.

Senior School
In Stage 5 (Years 9 and 10), students study a program that comprises two elective classes and Christian Principles and Relationships (CPR), as well as the courses mandated by The Board of Studies, Teaching and Educational Standards NSW (BOSTES). The compulsory core subjects are: English, Mathematics, Science, Australian History and Geography and PDHPE.

Electives are chosen from:

 Commerce
 Drama
 Food Technology
 History (Elective)
 Industrial Technology
 Information and Software Technology
 Music
 Physical Activity and Sports Studies (PASS)
 Visual Arts

In the final school stage (Years 11 and 12) students are prepared for the New South Wales Higher School Certificate. The Board of Studies, Teaching and Educational Standards NSW (BOSTES) requires Stage 6 students to study a minimum of 12 units in the Preliminary Year and 10 units in their HSC Year (All subjects are worth 2 units, except for extension courses, which are worth 1 unit ). HSC English is compulsory.

Co-curricular

Infants School

 Individual Piano Lessons
 Percussion
 Sensory Integration Program
 Specialist Music Teacher
 Specialist Sports Teacher
 Speech and Drama
 Interschool Hockey Competition with local private and public schools.

Junior School
Students are encouraged to be involved in a wide range of activities including:
 Junior Band
 Choir
 Interschool Hockey Competition with local private and public schools.
 Individual and Small Group Music Lessons
 Jump Rope Team
 Musical Performance
 Percussion
 Speech & Drama
 Specialist Sports Teacher
 Student Representative Council
 Leadership Training

Middle school
Students are encouraged to be involved in a wide range of activities including:

 SGCS Band
 Choir
 Chess Club
 Jump Rope Team
 Leadership Team
 Robotics Club
 Student Representative Council

 Year 6 combine with Junior School students for interschool sports teams and carnivals
 Years 7 and 8 combine with Senior School students for interschool sports teams and carnivals.

Senior School
Students are encouraged to be involved in a wide range of activities including:
 'Pulse' - Senior School fellowship group which meets weekly and is run by Year 12 Prefects
 Band & Percussion - Private Tuition and band leadership provided during school hours
 Senior School Music Ensembles: String Group, Senior Band and Chapel Band
 'Beyond Ourselves' - Outreach group that meets regularly to plan the schools outreach vision of 'Beyond Ourselves'
 Robotics Club - Running weekly, with a beginners club running on Thursdays and an advanced club running on Fridays

Outdoor Education
The Duke of Edinburgh's Award Scheme is offered to all students in Year 9-11 and students are encouraged to complete the three-year training involved.  Camping and hiking expeditions which are a compulsory element of the Scheme are undertaken over weekends.
Year 9 - Bronze Level
Year 10 - Silver Level
Year 11 - Gold Level

Sport
Sport undertaken include: Swimming, Athletics, Cross Country Running, Netball, Tennis, Volleyball, Soccer and Rope Skipping.

House system
Upon entry to the school, each student is allocated, according to age and gender, or family tradition, to one of the four Houses:

 

Houses form the basis for sporting and cultural competitions or interactions within the School, including:
 Athletics Carnivals
 Cross Country Carnivals
 Swimming Carnivals
 'House Day'  - students from Years 6-12 are involved in a Gala Day of various sporting tournaments.

Notable alumni
 Tim Tszyu
 Marc Fennell

See also

 List of non-government schools in New South Wales

References

External links
 St George Christian School Website
 Google Maps

Private secondary schools in Sydney
Educational institutions established in 1981
Nondenominational Christian schools in Sydney
Private primary schools in Sydney
Hurstville, New South Wales
Christian School
1981 establishments in Australia